The 30th AVN Awards ceremony, or XXX AVN Awards, was an event during which Adult Video News (AVN) presented its annual AVN Awards to honor the best pornographic movies and adult entertainment products of 2012. Movies or products released between October 1, 2011, and September 30, 2012, were eligible. The ceremony was held on January 19, 2013 at The Joint in the Hard Rock Hotel and Casino, Paradise, Nevada. Comedian April Macie, AVN Hall of Fame inductee Jesse Jane and Asa Akira, who won Female Performer of the Year, hosted the AVN Awards. The awards show was held immediately after the Adult Entertainment Expo at the same venue.

Best Romance Release was one of several new categories created for the 30th Awards Show. The new categories "reflect the ever-evolving market trends of the business" and the Best Romance award is for a movie with a romantic story line geared specifically to women or couples. Torn, starring best actor winner Steven St. Croix, won the first Best Romance award.

Wasteland took top honors as Movie of the Year, also winning best drama and six other awards, including a directing award for Graham Travis, who also directed the previous year's top movie, and a Best Actress victory for Lily Carter. Star Wars XXX: A Porn Parody took six awards including Best Parody – Comedy.

Octomom Home Alone won the Best Celebrity Sex Tape category, while Axel Braun won his third straight Director of the Year award and Remy LaCroix won the AVN Best New Starlet Award. All winners were presented newly redesigned trophies, depicting an intertwined couple, to celebrate the awards' 30th anniversary.

Winners and nominees 

The nominees for the 30th AVN Awards were announced on November 30, 2012.

Major awards 
Winners of categories announced during the awards ceremony January 19, 2013, are highlighted in boldface.

Additional Award Winners 
These awards were not presented during the awards ceremony itself but were announced separately. In addition, the awards for Best Animated Release, Best Gonzo Series, Best Softcore Release, and Best Vignette Series were on the list of award categories, but were not presented in 2013.

Video/DVD Categories
 Best All-Girl Group Sex Scene: Brooklyn Lee, Ruth Medina, Samantha Bentley - Brooklyn Lee: Nymphomaniac
 Best All-Girl Release: Dani
 Best All-Girl Series: Women Seeking Women
 Best All-Sex Release: Oil Overload 7
 Best Amateur Release: Dare Dorm 9
 Best Amateur Series: College Rules
 Best Anal Release: Anal Boot Camp
 Best Anal Series: Anal Fanatic
 Best Art Direction: Star Wars XXX: A Porn Parody
 Best BDSM Release: Rubber Bordello
 Best Big Bust Release: Big Wet Tits 11
 Best Big Bust Series: Boobaholics Anonymous
 Best Big Butt Release: Big Wet Asses 21
 Best Big Butt Series: Big Wet Asses
 Best Celebrity Sex Tape: Octomom Home Alone
 Best Classic Release: Buttwoman II: Behind Bars
 Best Comedy: Nurses 2
 Best Continuing Series: Slutty and Sluttier - Manuel Ferrara/Evil Angel
 Best Director – Foreign Feature: Max Candy - Inglorious Bitches
 Best Director – Foreign Non-Feature: Ettore Buchi - Adventures on the Lust Boat 2
 Best Director – Non Feature: Jules Jordan - Alexis Ford Darkside
 Best Director – Parody: Axel Braun - Star Wars XXX: A Porn Parody
 Best Double Penetration Sex Scene: Asa Akira, Ramón Nomar, Mick Blue - Asa Akira Is Insatiable 3
 Best DVD Extras: Voracious: The First Season - John Stagliano/Evil Angel
 Best Educational Release: Belladonna's How to: “Fuck!”
 Best Ethnic Release – Asian: Asian Fuck Faces
 Best Ethnic Release – Black: Porn's Top Black Models 3
 Best Ethnic Release – Latin: Latin Mommas 2
 Best Ethnic Series: Big Wet Brazilian Asses
 Best Fem-Dom Strap-On Release: His Booty Is My Duty 2
 Best Foot/Leg Fetish Release: Asphyxia Heels the World
 Best Foreign Continuing Series: Art of Penetration
 Best Foreign Non-Feature: Brooklyn Lee: Nymphomaniac
 Best Gonzo Release: Bobbi Violates San Francisco
 Best Group Sex Scene: Asa Akira, Erik Everhard, Ramón Nomar, Mick Blue - Asa Akira Is Insatiable 3
 Best Internal Release: Big Tit Cream Pie 13
 Best Interracial Release: Mandingo Massacre 2
 Best Interracial Series: Mandingo Massacre
 Best Makeup: Chauncey Baker, Shelby Stevens - Men in Black: A Hardcore Parody
 Best Male Newcomer: Logan Pierce
 Best MILF/Cougar Release: It's a Mommy Thing! 6
 Best MILF/Cougar Series: MILFs Like It Big
 Best Music Soundtrack: Rubber Bordello
 Best New Production Company: Skow Digital
 Best New Series: Ultimate Fuck Toy
 Best Non-Sex Performance: James Bartholet, Not The Three Stooges XXX
 Best Older Woman/Younger Girl Release: Cheer Squad Sleepovers
 Best Oral Release: American Cocksucking Sluts 2
 Best Oral Series: Massive Facials
 Best Orgy/Gangbang Release: Gangbanged 4
 Best Original Song: "She-donistic Society" by Fat Mike - Rubber Bordello
 Best Overall Marketing Campaign – Company Image: Girlfriends Films
 Best Overall Marketing Campaign – Individual Project: Star Wars XXX: A Porn Parody - Axel Braun/Vivid
 Best Packaging: Birds of Prey XXX: A Sinister Comixxx Parody - Sinister Comixxx/Pure Play
 Best POV Release: Eye Fucked Them All

Video/DVD Categories (ctd.)
 Best POV Series: Pound the Round P.O.V.
 Best POV Sex Scene: Asa Akira, Jules Jordan, Asa Akira to the Limit
 Best Pro-Am Release: Brand New Faces 36: Natural Newbies
 Best Pro-Am Series: Brand New Faces
 Best Renting and Selling Release: -  Star Wars XXX: A Porn Parody
 Best Screenplay – Parody:  Axel Braun, Mark Logan - Star Wars XXX: A Porn Parody
 Best Solo Sex Scene: Joanna Angel - Joanna Angel: Filthy Whore
 Best Special Effects: Men in Black: A Hardcore Parody
 Best Specialty Release – Other Genre: Brand New Faces 35: Curvy Edition
 Best Specialty Series – Other Genre: Mother-Daughter Exchange Club
 Best Squirting Release: Seasoned Players 17: The Squirting Edition
 Best Supporting Actor: Tom Byron, Star Wars XXX: A Porn Parody
 Best Supporting Actress: Capri Anderson - Pee-Wee's XXX Adventure: A Porn Parody
 Best Tease Performance: Remy LaCroix, Lexi Belle - Remy
 Best 3D Release: Jailhouse Heat 3D
 Best Three-Way Sex Scene – Boy/Boy/Girl: Mick Blue, Ramón Nomar, Lexi Belle, Lexi
 Best Three-Way Sex Scene – Girl/Girl/Boy: Asa Akira, Brooklyn Lee, James Deen - Asa Akira Is Insatiable 3
 Best Transsexual Release: American She-Male X
 Best Transsexual Series: America's Next Top Tranny
 Best Transsexual Sex Scene: Foxxy, Christian XXX - American Tranny 2
 Best Vignette Release: Slutty and Sluttier 16
 Best Wall-to-Wall Release: Best New Starlets 2012
 Best Young Girl Release: Cuties 3
 Best Young Girl Series: The Innocence of Youth
 Clever Title of the Year: Does This Dick Make My Ass Look Big?
 Crossover Star of the Year: James Deen, Sunny Leone (tie)
 Female Foreign Performer of the Year: Aleska Diamond
 Male Foreign Performer of the Year: Rocco Siffredi
 MILF/Cougar Performer of the Year: Julia Ann
 Most Outrageous Sex Scene: Brooklyn Lee, Rocco Siffredi in “Clothespin-Head” from Voracious: The First Season
 Unsung Male Performer of the Year: Mark Ashley
 Unsung Starlet of the Year: Brandy Aniston

Pleasure Products
 Best Boutique: Feelmore 510 (Oakland)
 Best Enhancement Manufacturer: The Screaming O
 Best Fetish Manufacturer: Sportsheets
 Best Lingerie or Apparel Manufacturer: Baci Lingerie
 Best Lubricant Manufacturer: Pjur USA
 Best Pleasure Product Manufacturer – Small: Jimmyjane
 Best Pleasure Product Manufacturer – Medium: JOPEN
 Best Pleasure Product Manufacturer – Large: Fleshlight
 Best Product Line for Men: Ego, JOPEN
 Best Product Line for Women: Insignia, LELO

Retail and Distribution
 Best Adult Distributor: IVD/East Coast News
 Best Retail Chain – Small: The Pleasure Chest
 Best Retail Chain – Large: Adam & Eve

Web and Technology Categories
 Best Affiliate Program: PussyCash
 Best Alternative Website: Kink.com
 Best Dating Website: AdultFriendFinder.com
 Best Live Chat Website: LiveJasmin.com
 Best Membership Site: Brazzers.com
 Best Online Retail Website: AdultDVDEmpire.com
 Best Photography Website: AndrewBlake.com
 Best Porn Star Website: Joanna Angel - JoannaAngel.com
 Best Solo Girl Website: Jelena Jensen - JelenaJensen.com
 Best Studio Website: Evil Angel - EvilAngelVideo.com
 Best Web Premiere: Voracious: Episodes 1–9 - EvilAngel.com

Honorary AVN Awards

Reuben Sturman Award 
Lasse Braun was awarded the Reuben Sturman Award, which "recognizes industry stalwarts who've made revolutionary strides for industry rights by battling legal and free speech obstructions."

Visionary Award 
Adam & Eve founder Phil Harvey was chosen to receive the second annual Visionary Award "not only for his success in taking a novelty start-up company into nearly every realm of adult commerce, but also for his sense of civic responsibility in helping to prevent the scourge of sexually transmitted diseases and unwanted pregnancies from destroying lives in Third World countries."

Hall of Fame 
The AVN Awards Hall of Fame inductees, "a handful of individuals who’ve left a perennial imprint in the history pages of the adult entertainment industry," for 2013 were:
 Video Branch: Kandi Barbour, Ashley Blue, Vanessa Blue, Mary Carey, Francois Clousot, Manuel Ferrara, Jesse Jane, Rebecca Lord, Shy Love, Anna Malle, Katie Morgan, Ralph Parfait, Mike Quasar, Julie Simone, Chris Streams and Vaniity
 Internet Founders Branch: Danni Ashe, Founder of Danni's Hard Drive; Anthony J., Founder of NetVideoGirls.com; and Bill Pinyon & Steve Wojcik, Founders of Badpuppy.com
 Pleasure Product Branch: Dennis Paradise of Paradise Marketing, Mark Franks of Castle Megastore, and Teddy Rothstein, Irwin Schwartz & Elliot Schwartz of Nasstoys/Novelties by Nasswalk

Multiple awards and nominations 

The following releases received multiple awards:
 6 awards: Star Wars XXX: A Porn Parody
 3 awards: Asa Akira Is Insatiable 3, Rubber Bordello
 2 awards: Alexis Ford Darkside, Asa Akira to the Limit, Brooklyn Lee: Nymphomaniac, Men in Black: A Hardcore Parody, Oil Overload 7, Torn, Voracious: The First Season

The following releases received the most nominations:
 20 nominations: Star Wars XXX: A Porn Parody
 18 nominations: Voracious: The First Season
 14 nominations: Men in Black: A Hardcore Parody & Spartacus MMXII: The Beginning

The following individuals received multiple awards:
 5 awards: Asa Akira
 4 awards: Brooklyn Lee
 3 awards: Lexi Belle, Mick Blue, Axel Braun, James Deen, Ramón Nomar, Rocco Siffredi, Graham Travis
 2 awards: Joanna Angel, Jules Jordan, Remy LaCroix, Riley Steele
 
The following individuals received the most nominations:
 17 nominations: Mick Blue & James Deen
 14 nominations: Brooklyn Lee & Lexi Belle
 13 nominations: Asa Akira, Lily Carter, Manuel Ferrara
 11 nominations: Ramón Nomar
 10 nominations: Chanel Preston & Nacho Vidal
 9 nominations: Bobbi Starr, Joanna Angel, Erik Everhard, Mr. Pete, Lee Roy Myers
 8 nominations: Dani Daniels & Gracie Glam
 7 nominations: Allie Haze, Remy LaCroix, Skin Diamond, Kristina Rose, Brad Armstrong

Presenters and performers 
The following individuals were presenters or performers during the awards ceremony:

Presenters

Trophy girls 

 Bonnie Rotten
 Teal Conrad
 Rikki Six

Performers

Ceremony information

Changes to awards categories 
Beginning with the 30th AVN Awards, the following changes to award categories took place:

 The AVN Award for Best Feature has been renamed Best Drama to properly complement Best Comedy.
 The AVN Award for Best All-Sex Release - Mixed Format has been renamed Best Wall-to-Wall Release for movies that mix gonzo, vignette and all-sex scene genres.
 The discontinued AVN Award previously known as Best All-Sex/Vignette Series has been reintroduced as Best Continuing Series. (Similarly, the existing Best Foreign All-Sex Series and Best Foreign All-Sex Release awards were renamed Best Foreign Continuing Series and Best Foreign Non-Feature respectively.)
 The discontinued AVN Award Best New Production Company has been reintroduced because of market expansion.
 New categories, including Best Romance Release, Best Star Showcase and Best Transsexual Sex Scene have been introduced to reflect evolving market trends.

Reception and review
Some media outlets were impressed by the show. Robin Leach of the Las Vegas Sun reported, "It was the annual sea of sexiness that couldn't take place anywhere else in the world." He also noted the large size of the crowd as did the Huffington Post, which pointed out, "Thousands of fanboys and porn stars flooded the halls" and "all the A-listers were there."

In Memoriam 
As the show was beginning, AVN used a video segment to pay a tribute to adult-industry personalities who had died since the 2012 awards show:
 Actress Kandi Barbour
 Actor Sledge Hammer
 Actress Hollie Stevens
 Director Kirdy Stevens (Taboo 1–5) 
 Big Top Video's Sam Lessner
 Mainstream softcore director Zalman King 
 First Amendment to the United States Constitution attorney Steven Swander.

Time constraints prevented the segment from being re-edited to include director Fred J. Lincoln, who had died a couple of days earlier.

See also

 AVN Awards
 AVN Award for Male Performer of the Year
 AVN Female Performer of the Year Award
 AVN Award for Male Foreign Performer of the Year
 List of members of the AVN Hall of Fame

Notes

 Rather than nominees for the Movie of the Year category, voting is conducted separately just prior to the awards ceremony from among winners in "best release" categories including those listed.

References

External links

  - Complete list of winners
 The 2013 AVN Awards Show on YouTube
 Adult Video News Awards at the IMDb
 
 AVN Awards Nominees:
2013 (archived at Wayback Machine, January 18, 2013)
2013 AVN Award nominees

AVN Awards
AVN Awards 30